Cornelis Wilhelmus Nicolaas "Cees" van Bladel (born 2 May 1962 in Eindhoven) is a sailor from the Netherlands, who represented his country at the 1988 Summer Olympics in Pusan. With  his older brother Willy van Bladel as crew, Van Bladel took the 9th place in the Tornado. Earlier during the 1984 Olympics Van Bladel vas a substitute for the Dutch Olympic Sailing Team.

Sailing career
After sailing Vaurien and 470 with his brother Willy van Bladel he made the move to the Tornado.

Professional life
Van Bladel holds a bachelor's degree at the Fontys Hogescholen (1980–1984) and a Master's degree at the Vrije Universiteit (1984–1988) in Human Movement Science. Van Bladel held the following positions:
 Taakveldcoordinator sector welzijn, Eindhoven (1991–2005)
 Projectmanager, Sports and Technology (2005 – present)
 Owner Planeer b.v. (2005 – present)
 Director InnoSportLab Sailing (2009 – present)
 Owner, Director Volans Solutions b.v (2010 – present)

Sources
 
 
 
 
 
 
 
 
 
 
 
 
 
 
 
 
 
 
 
 
 
 
 
 

Living people
1960 births
Sportspeople from Eindhoven
Dutch male sailors (sport)
470 class sailors
Sailors at the 1988 Summer Olympics – Tornado
Olympic sailors of the Netherlands
Vaurien class sailors
20th-century Dutch people